Theatre was an experimental mathcore outfit formed in the lower suburbs of Somerset West, South Africa in 2008. They bring genre-smashing music to the foreground that is both unique in construction and chaotic in design, which is brought forth by means of a notably destructive yet emotive performance, with "live shows that truly defy the norm".

History
Theatre started out, as any new project would, as a simple concept which came about when brothers, Tarquin and Byron Jones of the late Eve of My Collapse began collaborating with JJ van Rooyen, former frontman of Era of the Hero. After welcoming members Schalk Venter and Duke van Heerden, the band was set to begin writing. The writing process was difficult and intricate, as the band was yet to find its true sound. In early 2009, Schalk stepped down from his position as bassist, but remained a part of the band as art director and occasional percussionist. Theatre, quickly filled the position with former-Era bassist, Jacques Jordaan. The band was complete and ready to hit the stage.

The past two years have held many great opportunities for the band. They managed to land spots on many local tour shows, such as the Truth & Its Burden's Give Life Tour, Show & Tell's Riot To Revival Tour and New Altum's Mayhem Tour. However, after the leave of bassist Jacques Jordaan, Theatre found themselves having to find a new soul to fill the spot. The position was filled by Jay Dee Bekker, former guitarist of The Inside Job, and once again the band was complete. Theatre continued to land a few bigger tour shows, including Show & Tell's Fight For Her Beauty Tour, Through This Defiance's world tour, HORSE The Band's Reigns in Africa Tour, and Becoming The Archetype's Stronghold Tour.

With experience and a well-polished set of material, the band proceeded to record their debut album entitled Atlantic at Considerthis Studios in Somerset West, with the aid of local producer Deon Van Zyl who mixed the tracks. The album was later mastered by Dean Bailey, an independent producer in Plumstead. The album was launched on the weekend of 10 December 2010. Theatre continued to play a few local shows before heading to Durban over New Years to play a few shows including Arisefest. Theatre is currently in the writing process, focussing on their new material for 2011.

On 4 September 2011 Theatre issued the following:
After three long years of jamming together, we have decided to finally let Theatre find its rest. We have had the most amazing journeys and moments we will never forget, but the time has come for each of us to pursue our own road, be it family, work, or studies. We would like to thank everyone who has supported us through our endeavours, and we hope that we have been able to share our love for music with you all. Bless the noise. Much love. Theatre.

Members
Present members

Past members

Discography
Studio albums
2010: Atlantic

Commentary
Real music being played by real people delivering the most brutal wall of sound you have ever heard!
– Kevin Whittemore, La Dispute

A brutal musical attack that is a perfect vessel for the hard truth they deliver.
- DJ Clutch, The Source FM

The Chariot fans will love this band, nearing their absolute insanity on the stage, giving their crowd a performance that will stain their minds.
- Jayson Buxton, Show & Tell

References

External links
 Theatre on Facebook
 Theatre on Myspace

South African musical groups
Mathcore musical groups
Musical groups established in 2008